A court of appeal is an appellate court. 

Court of Appeal may refer to:

In Australia:
Australian Capital Territory Court of Appeal, name used by the Supreme Court of the Australian Capital Territory exercising its appeal jurisdiction 
New South Wales Court of Appeal
Supreme Court of Victoria, Court of Appeal 
Court of Appeal of the Northern Territory of Australia
Supreme Court of Queensland, Court of Appeal
Supreme Court of Western Australia, Court of Appeal

In Belgium:
Court of appeal (Belgium)
In Brazil:

 Court of appeal of Rio Grande do Norte State

In Canada:

Federal Court of Appeal (Canada)
Alberta Court of Appeal
British Columbia Court of Appeal
Manitoba Court of Appeal
Court of Appeal of New Brunswick
Court of Appeal of Newfoundland and Labrador
Court of Appeal for the Northwest Territories
Nova Scotia Court of Appeal
Nunavut Court of Appeal
Court of Appeal for Ontario
Court of Appeal of Prince Edward Island
Quebec Court of Appeal
Court of Appeal for Saskatchewan
Court of Appeal of Yukon

In Cameroon:
Court of Appeal of Cameroon
In the Cook Islands:

 Cook Islands Court of Appeal

In Fiji:
Court of Appeal of Fiji

In France:
Court of Appeal of Paris
Court of appeal (France)
In Germany:

 High Court of Appeal of the Four Free Cities

In Hong Kong:
Court of Appeal (Hong Kong)
In Iceland:

 Court of Appeal (Iceland)

In Ireland:
Court of Appeal (Ireland)
Court of Appeal in Ireland
In Kenya:

 Court of Appeal of Kenya

In Kiribati:

 Kiribati Court of Appeal

In Malaysia:
Court of Appeal (Malaysia)
In Monaco:

 Court of Appeal of Monaco

In New Zealand:
Court of Appeal of New Zealand
In Nigeria:

 Nigerian Courts of Appeal

In Norway:
Court of appeal (Norway)
Agder Court of Appeal
Borgarting Court of Appeal
Eidsivating Court of Appeal
Frostating Court of Appeal
Gulating Court of Appeal
Hålogaland Court of Appeal
In Singapore:

 Court of Appeal of Singapore

In South Africa:
Supreme Court of Appeal
In Sri Lanka:

 Court of Appeal of Sri Lanka

In Sweden:
Courts of appeal in Sweden
Svea Court of Appeal
Göta Court of Appeal
Scania and Blekinge Court of Appeal
Court of Appeal for Western Sweden
Court of Appeal for Southern Norrland
Court of Appeal for Northern Norrland
In Tonga:

 Court of Appeal of Tonga

In Tuvalu:

 Court of Appeal of Tuvalu

In Uganda:

 Court of Appeal of Uganda

In Ukraine:

 Vinnytsia Administrative Court of Appeal

In the United Kingdom:

Court of Appeal in Chancery (no longer in existence)
Court of Appeal (England and Wales)
Court of Appeal (Northern Ireland)
East African Court of Appeal
West African Court of Appeal
West Indian Court of Appeal

In the United States of America:
California Courts of Appeal
Florida District Courts of Appeal
Florida First District Court of Appeal
Florida Second District Court of Appeal
Florida Third District Court of Appeal
Florida Fourth District Court of Appeal
Florida Fifth District Court of Appeal
Louisiana Circuit Courts of Appeal
Oklahoma Courts of Appeal

Nongovernmental:
Fédération Internationale de l'Automobile International Court of Appeal

See also

Court of Appeals (disambiguation)
List of Canadian courts of appeal
Appeal
Court of Criminal Appeal (disambiguation)